, commonly referred to just as , is a fictional character who is the protagonist in the manga and anime series Eyeshield 21, created by Riichiro Inagaki and Yusuke Murata. In the series, he is a first-year Japanese high-school student who becomes a gofer to avoid being bullied. His running ability improves and he is noticed by Yoichi Hiruma, the American football team's captain, who gets him to join the Deimon Devil Bats as the team's running back under the name "Eyeshield 21". Sena has appeared in other media from the series, including video games, original video animations (OVAs) and light novels.

When he created a protagonist to the series, Inagaki intended to create a "wimp" who is a good athlete, then he decided the series main theme, American football, and eventually created Sena. In the 2003 anime OVA which preceded the anime series, he is voiced by Romi Park; however, she was replaced by Miyu Irino in the 2005 Japanese anime television series. In the English adaptation, he is voiced by Yuri Lowenthal. Sena has been well received by manga and anime publications. Merchandise has been created for the character, including action figures, cosplay pieces and resin and ceramic statues.

Development and voice portrayal
When Inagaki was planning the Eyeshield 21 series, he wanted to create a "protagonist that was wimpy at the beginning, yet could perform outstandingly in a sports game"; from this premise, he choose American football as the main theme, eventually creating Sena. Inagaki has said that he is a fan of the St. Louis Rams and Marshall Faulk (a running back on the Rams). Inagaki said that seeing how Faulk ran inspired him to create the character. He chose Sena's name as an homage to the Brazilian Formula One driver Ayrton Senna.

In the first adaptation of the Eyeshield 21 manga, a 2003 Jump Festa OVA titled The Phantom Golden Bowl, he was voiced by voice actress Romi Park. The subsequently adaptation, however, did not use Park; rather Miyu Irino was chosen to be Sena's voice actor. Kokoro Kikuchi provided his voice while his younger self. In the English dubbing, the role has been played by Yuri Lowenthal.

Appearances

In Eyeshield 21
Because of his diminutive stature and weak appearance, Sena is bullied by his classmates in primary school; he is protected by Mamori Anezaki, his only friend. A new student, Riku Kaitani, teaches Sena how to outsprint his tormentors. Sena uses his running ability to be a gofer, which allows him to improve his running and dodging ability. Soon after entering senior high school Sena is coerced into playing American football by Yoichi Hiruma, who recognizes Sena's running ability and forces him to join the American football club, the Deimon Devil Bats. To conceal his identity Sena and to keep him from being recruited by other teams, Sena wears a green eyeshield and Hiruma picks the alias "Eyeshield 21" after a famous Japanese athlete in the United States.

The Deimon Devil Bats enter the spring tournament; they lose to the Ojo White Knights, but Sena decides to stay on the team because he finds it fun. They train for the autumn tournament, hoping to be the best team in Tokyo and advance to the Kanto tournament and the Christmas Bowl (between the best high-school American football teams in Japan). Despite Hiruma's desire to keep the identity of Eyeshield 21 a secret, Sena reveals his identity to his teammates when they are training in the United States. He later reveals his identity to Mamori and everyone against Bando Spiders, when Hayato Akaba claims to be Eyeshield 21. Sena eventually beats Akaba, claiming the title of Eyeshield 21. At the Kanto tournament, after defeating Shinryuji Naga, his rival Ojo White Knights' Seijuro Shin, and the Hakushu Dinosaurs, Sena is the tournament's MVP and the Devil Bats win the chance to play in the Christmas Bowl.

In the big game, Sena proves his right to the name by defeating Takeru Yamatothe original Eyeshield 21and winning the championship. After winning the Christmas Bowl, Sena is asked to create a national team with Monta, Yamato and Taka Honjo. The four split up to find players for a Japanese team for the International Youth American Football tournament. They advance to the finals against the U.S., and the game ends in a tie. Two years later, Sena plays for Notre Dame in the U.S. during the last half of his last year in Deimon. He returns to Japan to attend Enma College, opposing some of his former teammates (students at other colleges) as they compete to play in the Rice Bowl (the game between the best college American-football teams).

In other media
Sena has made several appearances outside the Eyeshield 21 anime and manga. He appears in both of the original video animations produced for the series: helping the Deimon Devil Bats to defeat the Uraharajuku Boarders in the Golden Bowl in the first OVA, and surviving on a desert island (after Hiruma leaves him and his teammates to train) in the second. As the series' title character, Sena is playable in all Eyeshield 21 games. These usually feature the manga's original story, but Eyeshield 21: Devilbats Devildays features other storylines. In Eyeshield 21: Max Devil Power!, Sena can play for teams other than the Devil Bats. He also appears in the crossover games Jump Super Stars and Jump Ultimate Stars as a supporting character.

Reception
The character of Sena has been well received by manga readers and as the series continued he went on to become one of the most popular characters among the Eyeshield 21 reader base, having consistently placed near the top of the Weekly Shōnen Jump character popularity polls of the series. In the first poll he placed first, and second in two others (behind Hiruma). He was also chosen by the readers the one who would win a "Stars Showdown" against Seijuro Shin, as well as the best running back in the series. In an interview, Miyu Irino said about Sena: "he can be pathetic and weak" but "in case of emergency" Sena can be "incredibly cool". Merchandise based on his character has been released, including action figures, cosplay pieces, and resin and ceramic statues.

Several publications for manga and anime have commented on Sena's character. Ain't It Cool News' Scott Green qualified Sena as "a rather likable put upon hero and visually interesting lead". Carlo Santos of Anime News Network (ANN) noted Sena fell into "the archetypal shōnen protagonist" and "the underdog who falls and gets up over and over again" mold, but praised Sena, calling him "the polar opposite of those talkative, obnoxious, up-and-at-'em heroes that populate so many other series". Writing for Mania.com, Jarred Pine also called Sena an archetypical character but noted him as a "very likeable" character. Pine praised his debut, saying that it "was a memorable one, as it was both intense and hilarious". Later, he stated that a lead you can cheer for is essential to a sports manga, commenting that Sena "fills that role quite well." The contrast with "Sena's hard effort and Hiruma's trickery and devilish nature" was also praised by Pine. His doormat characteristics was initially "worrying" according to Manga Life's Kevin Hill who said he became "far more likeable" once he meets up Hiruma and Kurita. Zac Bertschy of ANN said that Sena, "unlike so many other shōnen sports heroes, stops moping around and doubting himself and generally tries his damndest"; he is "introspective, kind, and resourceful, something most shōnen heroes can't claim by the third volume of their respective series". Chris Homer of The Fandom Post also shared the feeling that Sena is a "typical protagonist", but remarked how he develops into a more confident character, which "is key to the series" and makes him "a more than acceptable protagonist".

References 

Child characters in anime and manga
Comics characters introduced in 2002
Eyeshield 21 characters
Fictional Japanese people in anime and manga
Fictional players of American football
Male characters in anime and manga